Sofia Goncharova (born 7 June 1981 in Chita, Zabaykalsky Krai) is a Russian athlete who competes in compound archery. She has represented Russia since 2001, and was ranked number one in the world from June 2006 to July 2007.

She has won both major World Archery compound competitions, the World Championships in 2005 and the inaugural World Cup final in 2006, winning three of four stages on the way.

References

1981 births
Living people
Russian female archers
World Archery Championships medalists
Universiade medalists in archery
Universiade bronze medalists for Russia
Medalists at the 2003 Summer Universiade
People from Chita, Zabaykalsky Krai
Sportspeople from Zabaykalsky Krai
20th-century Russian women
21st-century Russian women